"History Repeats Itself" is a 1966 narrated song written and recorded by Buddy Starcher. It became his greatest hit, reaching number 39 on the U.S. Billboard Hot 100 and number two on the Country singles chart.

The lyrics recount the Lincoln–Kennedy coincidences urban legend, set to the tune of The Battle-Hymn of the Republic.

Lyrical content
The song begins with the conclusion of the chorus of The Battle Hymn of the Republic. The lyrics recount curious coincidences and parallels (several of them false) between the careers and deaths of Presidents Abraham Lincoln and John F. Kennedy. These had begun attracting attention in the US mainstream press in 1964 (the year after Kennedy's assassination).

Starcher also recorded a "Part 2," as there are too many similarities to be recounted in just one song.

Just a few of the noted similarities shared by both presidents include:  Being elected in years ending in '60, both concerned with civil rights issues. Both first ladies lost a child while in the White House.  Both presidents were shot in the back of the head on a Friday, in the presence of their wives. Their assassins were born in years ending '39, and both espousing radical ideologies. Their successors were both southern senators named Johnson, both born in years ending in '08.

Several of these similarities are false, for example Booth was born in 1838, while Lee Oswald was born in 1939.

Cover version
"History Repeats Itself" was covered by Cab Calloway, charting concurrently with Starcher's version and debuting on the charts one week later. In 1967 it was also covered in Dutch by Gerard de Vries as De Geschiedenis Herhaalt Zich.

Chart history
Buddy Starcher original

Cab Calloway cover

Parody
A parody of this recording, "Great Men Repeat Themselves", described purported coincidental similarities between President Lyndon Johnson and the superhero Batman. Both Homer and Jethro and Ben Colder recorded versions of the parody.

See also
 Lincoln–Kennedy coincidences

References

External links
 Lyrics of this song
 
 
 

1966 songs
1966 singles
Songs about the assassination of John F. Kennedy
Songs about Abraham Lincoln
Cab Calloway songs
Recitation songs